Bill Meek (born May 14, 1953, in Upland, California) is an American sport shooter. He competed in the Summer Olympics in 1992 and 1996. In 1992, he placed ninth in the men's 50 metre rifle prone event; in 1996, he placed eighth in the men's 50 metre rifle prone event.

References

1953 births
Living people
People from Upland, California
ISSF rifle shooters
American male sport shooters
Shooters at the 1992 Summer Olympics
Shooters at the 1996 Summer Olympics
Olympic shooters of the United States